The 54th Rali Vinho da Madeira was the 9th rally of 2013 ERC Cup. The Italian driver Giandomenico Basso in Peugeot 207 S2000, won his 4th title in Madeira. Bruno Magalhães was the best Portuguese, finishing in 2nd place.

Results

Stage classification

References

Rally Madeira
Rali Vinho da Madeira